The five-hundred-euro note (€500) is the highest-value euro banknote and was produced between the introduction of the euro (in its cash form) in 2002 until 2019. Since 27 April 2019, the banknote has no longer been issued by central banks in the euro area, but continues to be legal tender and can be used as a means of payment.
It is one of the highest-value circulating banknotes in the world, worth around 525 USD; 3,600 CNY; 70,575 JPY; 492 CHF, 9,060,000 LAK or 441 GBP as of January 2023.
The note is used in the 25 countries which have the euro as their sole currency, with a population of about 343 million.

Initially, the high denomination notes were introduced very rapidly so that in the first 7 years (up to December 2008) there were 530million five-hundred-euro banknotes in circulation. Subsequently, the rate of increase was radically slowed. In December 2022, there were approximately 301 million banknotes in circulation (decreased from 614 million in 2015). It is the least widely circulated denomination, accounting for 1.0% of the total banknotes.
It is the largest note measuring 160 × 82 mm and has a purple colour scheme. The five-hundred-euro banknotes depict bridges and arches/doorways in modern architecture (around the late 20th century). The five-hundred-euro note contains several complex security features such as watermarks, invisible ink, holograms and microprinting that make counterfeiting very difficult.

The note is being phased out due to concerns of widespread use for illegal purposes. Most printing of new €500 notes ceased in 2019, although existing notes will remain legal tender until further notice.

History 

The euro was founded on 1 January 1999, when it became the currency of over 300million people in Europe. For the first three years of its existence it was an invisible currency, only used in accountancy. Euro cash was not introduced until 1 January 2002, when it replaced the national banknotes and coins of the 12 initial eurozone countries, such as the Luxembourgish franc.

Slovenia joined the Eurozone in 2007, Cyprus and Malta in 2008, Slovakia in 2009, Estonia in 2011, Latvia in 2014 and Lithuania joined on 1 January 2015.

The changeover period 
The changeover period during which the former currencies' notes and coins were exchanged for those of the euro lasted about two months, going from 1 January 2002 until 28 February 2002. The official date on which the national currencies ceased to be legal tender varied from member state to member state. The earliest date was in Germany, where the mark officially ceased to be legal tender on 31 December 2001, though the exchange period lasted for two months more. Even after the old currencies ceased to be legal tender, they continued to be accepted by national central banks for periods ranging from ten years to forever.

Design changes 
Notes printed before November 2003 bear the signature of the first president of the European Central Bank, Wim Duisenberg, who was replaced on 1 November 2003 by Jean-Claude Trichet, whose signature appears on issues from November 2003 to March 2012. Notes issued after March 2012 bear the signature of the third president of the European Central Bank, Mario Draghi.

As of June 2012, current issues do not reflect the expansion of the European Union. Cyprus is not depicted on current notes as the map does not extend far enough east and Malta is also missing as it does not meet the current series' minimum size for depiction. The European Central Bank is currently introducing a new series of euro banknotes. The 500-euro denomination, however, will not be included in the new series as it was decided to phase out issuance of 500-euro banknotes.

End of production and issuance 
The European Central Bank announced on 4 May 2016 that it would stop issuing the 500-euro notes by the end of 2018. This decision is due to the suspicion that the notes are widely used for illegal purposes, according to a high-ranking bank official, Benoît Cœuré. The notes were last printed in 2014 and the demand was satisfied since from stocks.

On 27 January 2019, 17 of 19 Eurosystem's central banks stopped issuing and distributing €500 banknotes. To ensure a smooth transition and for logistic reasons, the Deutsche Bundesbank and the Oesterreichische Nationalbank opted for longer period and issued banknotes until 26 April 2019. Circulating 500-euro notes remain legal tender and can continue to be used as a means of payment and store of value until further notice. Banks, bureaux de change and other commercial parties can keep recirculating the existing notes.  The date when euro banknotes of the first series cease to be legal tender will be announced "well in advance" by ECB. Banknotes will always retain their value and can be exchanged for an unlimited period of time at the Eurosystem central banks.

Design
The five-hundred-euro note measures at  ×  with a purple colour scheme. All bank notes depict bridges and arches/doorways in a different historical European style; the five-hundred-euro note shows Modern architecture (around the 20th century). Although Robert Kalina's original designs were intended to show real monuments, for political reasons the bridge and art are merely hypothetical examples of the architectural era. Nevertheless, the featured bridge is highly similar to Guadiana International Bridge.

Like all euro notes, it contains the denomination, the EU flag, the signature of the president of the ECB and the initials of said bank in different EU languages, a depiction of EU territories overseas, the stars from the EU flag and twelve security features as listed below.

Security features 

The five-hundred-euro note is protected by:
 Colour changing ink used on the numeral located on the back of the note, that appears to change colour from purple to brown, when the note is tilted.
 A transparent number printed in the top corner of the note, on both sides, appear to combine perfectly to form the value numeral when held against the light.
 A glossy stripe, situated at the back of the note, showing the value numeral and the euro symbol.
 A hologram, used on the note which appears to see the hologram image change between the value and a window or doorway, but in the background, it appears to be rainbow-coloured concentric circles of micro-letters moving from the centre to the edges of the patch.
 A EURion constellation; the EURion constellation is a pattern of symbols found on a number of banknote designs worldwide since about 1996. It is added to help software detect the presence of a banknote in a digital image.
 Watermarks, which appear when held up to the light.
 Raised printing in the main image, the lettering and the value numerals on the front of the banknotes will be raised.
 Ultraviolet ink; the paper itself does not glow, fibres embedded in the paper do appear, and be coloured red, blue and green, the EU flag is green and has orange stars, the ECB President's, currently Mario Draghi's, signature turns green, the large stars and small circles on the front glow and the European map, a bridge and the value numeral on the back appear in yellow.
 Microprinting, on various areas of the banknotes there is microprinting, for example, inside the "ΕΥΡΩ" (EURO in Greek characters) on the front. The micro-text is sharp, not blurred.
 A security thread, embedded in the banknote paper. The thread will appear as a dark stripe when held up to the light. The word "EURO" and the value is embedded in tiny letters on the thread.
 Perforations in the hologram which will form the euro symbol. There are also small numbers showing the value.
 A matted surface; the note paper is made out of pure cotton, which feels crisp and firm, but not limp or waxy.
 A serial number.

Crime 

The value of the note is much greater than many of the largest circulating notes of other major currencies, such as the United States 100-dollar bill. Thus a large monetary value can be concentrated into a small volume of notes. This facilitates crimes that deal in cash, including money laundering, drug dealing, and tax evasion. There have been calls to withdraw the note for this reason. However, some of the currencies the euro replaced had widely used high-value notes, including the 5,000 Austrian schillings (€363), the 1,000 Dutch guilders (€454), the 1,000 Deutsche Marks (€511), and 500 Latvian lats (€711).

Even though there were some valuable banknotes in the national currencies of Germany, Austria and the Netherlands, the number of banknotes was relatively small compared to the euro banknotes. At the end of the year 2000 there were 89.20 million 1,000 Deutsche Mark banknotes, 13.97 million 5,000 Austrian Schilling banknotes and 13.28 million 1,000 Dutch Guilder banknotes in circulation. Latvia had a negligible number of 500 lat banknotes. In contrast the European Central Bank ordered the production of 371 million €500 banknotes before 1 July 2002.

In particular, Spain had a quarter of all these high-value bills within its borders in 2006. This concentration of €500 notes is far greater than expected for an economy of Spain's size, as prior to conversion to euro the largest banknote was 10,000 Spanish pesetas, worth €60. These notes are rarely seen in every-day commerce – they have been nicknamed "Bin Ladens" by the populace (as the presence and appearance of the notes are well-known, but the notes themselves are quite difficult to find). The financial analyst Jeffrey Robinson had warned back in 1998 before issuance that he believed that the €500 note would be used mostly for drug trafficking and money laundering. British and Spanish police are using the bills to track money laundering.

As of 20 April 2010, money exchange offices in the United Kingdom were banned from selling €500 notes due to their use in money laundering. The Serious Organised Crime Agency claimed that "90% of all €500 notes sold in the UK are in the hands of organised crime", revealed during an eight-month analysis. The €500 note is worth about £400, depending on exchange rates (around eight times the value of the Bank of England's largest publicly circulated note), and had, according to SOCA, become the currency choice for criminal gangs to hide their profits.

The EU directive 2005/06/EC "on the prevention of the use of the financial system for the purpose of money laundering and terrorist financing" tries to prevent such crime by requiring banks, real estate agents, tax and business advisors or agents, casinos and more companies to investigate and report usage of cash in excess of €15,000.

In Denmark, which is an EU member state but which is not in the Eurozone, all transactions involving 500-euro notes have been banned since January 2020.

Circulation 

The European Central Bank is closely monitoring the circulation and stock of the euro coins and banknotes. It is a task of the Eurosystem to ensure an efficient and smooth supply of euro notes and to maintain their integrity throughout the euro area.

The first set of €500 banknotes was introduced in January 2002. The number of banknotes in circulation increased each year until 2011. In the period from 2011 until 2013 there was a decrease in the quantity of circulated banknotes.
 
The €500 banknote peaked at the end of March 2009 at 36.9% of the value of all euro banknotes. Circulation by numbers of notes peaked at 613,559,542 banknotes in December 2015 when the decision to not include this denomination in the new Europa series was made.
The amount of circulated banknotes decreased ever since.

The figures are as follows:

Legal information 
Legally, both the European Central Bank and the central banks of the eurozone countries have the right to issue the 7 different euro banknotes. In practice, only the national central banks of the zone physically issue and withdraw euro banknotes. The European Central Bank does not have a cash office and is not involved in any cash operations.

References

External links 

 

Euro banknotes
Five-hundred-base-unit banknotes